Frederick Thomas Ramscar (24 January 1919 – May 2003) was an English footballer who played in the Football League for Wolverhampton Wanderers, Queens Park Rangers, Preston North End, Northampton Town and Millwall.

References

External links
 

English footballers
English Football League players
1919 births
2003 deaths
Stockport County F.C. players
Wolverhampton Wanderers F.C. players
Queens Park Rangers F.C. players
Preston North End F.C. players
Northampton Town F.C. players
Millwall F.C. players
Peterborough United F.C. players
Association football forwards